Arão is a settlement in the parish of Mexilhoeira Grande, within the municipality of Portimão, Portugal.

References

Villages in the Algarve